In heraldry, or (/ɔːʁ/; French for "gold") is the tincture of gold and, together with argent (silver), belongs to the class of light tinctures called "metals", or light colours. In engravings and line drawings, it is hatched using a field of evenly spaced dots.  It is very frequently depicted as yellow, though gold leaf was used in many illuminated manuscripts and more extravagant rolls of arms.

The word "gold" is occasionally used in place of "or" in blazon, sometimes to prevent repetition of the word "or" in a blazon, or because this substitution was in fashion when the blazon was first written down, or when it is preferred by the officer of arms. The use of "gold" for "or" (and "silver" for "argent") was a short-lived fashion amongst certain heraldic writers in the mid-20th century who attempted to "demystify" and popularise the subject of heraldry.

"Or" is sometimes spelled with a capital letter (e.g. "Gules, a fess Or") so as not to confuse it with the conjunction "or". However, this incorrect heraldic usage is not met with in standard reference works such as Bernard Burke's General Armory, 1884 and Debrett's Peerage. Fox-Davies advocated leaving all tinctures uncapitalized. A correctly stated blazon should eliminate any possible confusion between the tincture or and the conjunction "or" (which is rare in blazons in any case), certainly for the reader with a basic competence in heraldry. 

Sometimes, the different tinctures are said to be connected with special meanings or virtues, and represent certain elements and precious stones. Even if this is an idea mostly disregarded by serious heraldists throughout the centuries, it may be of anecdotal interest to see what they are, since the information is often sought. Many sources give different meanings, but or is usually said to represent the following:

 Of jewels, the topaz
 Of heavenly bodies, the Sun
 Of metals, gold
 Of virtues, Faith or obedience and gentility

Gallery

See also

Gold (color)
Old Gold

References

Further reading
 Woodcock, Thomas and John Martin Robinson (1988). The Oxford Guide to Heraldry. Oxford: University Press. 

Shades of yellow
Gold
Metals (heraldry)